Bèrni or Berni is an Italian surname, may refer to:
 Aldo Berni (1909-1997), Italian-born British restaurateur, brother of Frank. Co-founder of Berni Inn
 Ángel Berni (1931-2017), Paraguayan footballer
 Antonio Berni (1905-1981), Argentine figurative artist
 David Berni (born 1970), Canadian actor, voice actor, stand-up comedian and writer
 Francesco Berni (died 1535), Italian poet
 Franco Berni (born 1965), Italian rugby union player
 Frank Berni (1903-2000), Italian-born British restaurateur, brother of Aldo. Co-founder of Berni Inn
 Mara Berni (born 1932), Italian stage, television and film actress
 Tim Berni (born 2000), Swiss ice hockey player
 Tommaso Berni (born 1983), Italian footballer

See also
 Berni (disambiguation)

References

Italian-language surnames